Russell S. Kokubun (born 1948), is a Democratic politician who became a member and Vice President of the Hawaii Senate.

Life
Russell S. Kokubun was born May 15, 1948 in Honolulu. He graduated from Punahou School in 1966, and Southern Methodist University in 1971.
During the 1970s he worked on various agricultural ventures on the island of Hawaii (Big Island).
From 1984 through 1988 he served on the council of Hawaii County and was its chair. In 1992 he ran for Mayor of Hawaii County, but lost to fellow Democrat Stephen K. Yamashiro. From 1995 to 1997 he was Yamashiro's executive assistant, and then deputy planning director of the county.

Senate career
Kokubun represented Hawaii's 2nd Senatorial District since his appointment in 2000. He was elected to the seat in 2002 and re-elected in 2004, 2006, and 2008.
The district includes portions of South Hilo District (portion of Waiakea Uka); Puna District (Keeau, Kurtistown, Mountain View, Glenwood, Pahoa, Hawaiian Acres, Orchid Land Estates, Hawaiian Paradise Park, Pohoiki, Opihikao, Kehena, Kaimū, Kalapana, Volcano); and Kaʻū District (Pāhala, Punaluu, Ninole, Honuapo, Naalehu, Kahuku) on the island of Hawaii.

In 2007 he was a member of the Joint Senate–House Investigative Committee on the Bureau of Conveyances.
As of the 2009 Legislative Session, Kokubun was a member of the Senate committees on Energy and Environment; Higher Education; Water, Land, Agriculture, and Hawaiian Affairs; and Ways and Means.

References

External links
Hawai‘i 2050 Sustainability Task Force Message from the Chair
Follow the Money – Russell Kokubun
2006 2004 2002 campaign contributions

1948 births
Living people
Hawaii County Council members
Hawaii politicians of Japanese descent
Hawaii state senators
People from Hawaii (island)
People from Honolulu
Punahou School alumni